Al-Hajj Shabazz (born August 2, 1992) is a former American football cornerback. He played college football at West Chester University.

College career
Shabazz played collegiately at Division II West Chester University under coach Bill Zwann. As a junior, he had four interceptions and returned one for a touchdown. As a senior, he led West Chester University in interceptions with five, pass breakups with 11, in addition to making 39 tackles. West Chester University went 11-2 and Shabazz was named an All-American. He was invited to the NFL Player's Association Collegiate Bowl and recorded six tackles. He was one of 11 non-Division I players invited to the game.

Professional career

Indianapolis Colts
Shabazz signed with the Indianapolis Colts in May 2015.

Tampa Bay Buccaneers
Shabazz signed with the Tampa Bay Buccaneers on July 29, 2015.

Pittsburgh Steelers
On February 4, 2016, Shabazz signed a futures contract with the Pittsburgh Steelers. On September 3, 2016, he was released by the Steelers as part of final roster cuts and was signed to the practice squad the next day. On October 8, 2016, he was promoted to the Steelers' active roster. On October 9, 2016, he made his professional regular season debut against the New York Jets and recorded his first career tackle. He was released on October 15, 2016 and was re-signed to the practice squad. He was promoted back to the active roster on November 5, 2016. He was released again on December 3, 2016.

Houston Texans
On December 5, 2016, Shabazz was claimed off waivers by the Houston Texans. He was waived on December 17, 2016.

Pittsburgh Steelers (second stint)
On December 20, 2016, Shabazz was re-signed to Pittsburgh's practice squad. He was promoted to the active roster on December 24, 2016. He was released by the Steelers on May 2, 2017.

Baltimore Ravens
On June 5, 2017, Shabazz signed with the Baltimore Ravens. He was waived/injured on August 7, 2017 and was placed on injured reserve. He was released on August 11, 2017.

References

External links
West Chester Golden Rams bio
Pittsburgh Steelers bio

1992 births
Living people
John Bartram High School alumni

Players of American football from Philadelphia
American football cornerbacks
West Chester Golden Rams football players
Indianapolis Colts players
Tampa Bay Buccaneers players
Pittsburgh Steelers players
Houston Texans players
Baltimore Ravens players